is an interchange passenger railway station located in the city of Maibara, Shiga, Japan. On the border between West Japan Railway Company (JR West) and Central Japan Railway Company (JR Central), it is jointly operated by both companies, along with the private railway operator Ohmi Railway. It is also a freight depot for the Japan Freight Railway Company (JR Freight).

Lines
Maibara Station is served by the JR West Hokuriku Main Line and the Biwako Line section of the Tōkaidō Main Line.

Station layout

JR
The JR portion of the station consists of three island platforms with six tracks for the Tōkaidō Line and the Hokuriku Line. There is an island platform, and a side platform with five tracks for the Tōkaidō Shinkansen.

Platforms

Ohmi Railway
The Ohmi Railway portion of the station consists of one island platform serving two tracks.

Platforms

Adjacent stations

History
Maibara Station opened on 1 July 1889 as a station on the Japanese Government Railway (JGR) Tōkaidō Line, which became the Japan National Railways (JNR) after World War II. The Ohmi Railway began operations of 15 March 1931. The station came under the aegis of the West Japan Railway Company (JR West) on 1 April 1987 due to the privatization of the JNR.

Station numbering was introduced to the JR West and JR Central platforms in March 2018 with Maibara being assigned station number JR-A12 for the Biwako Line and CA83 on the JR Central network.

Passenger statistics
In fiscal 2018, the JR West portion of the station was used by an average of 5,514 passengers daily, the JR Central portion by 7,240 passengers daily  (boarding passengers only). The Ohmi Railway portion of the station was used by 1,069 passengers daily  (boarding passengers only) in 2015.

Surrounding area
Maibara City Society of Commerce
Shiga Prefectural Cultural Industry Exchange Center 
Shiga Prefectural Maibara High School
Yanmar Central Research Institute

See also
List of railway stations in Japan

References

External links

JR West official home page
JR Central official home page
Ohmi Railway Official home page

Railway stations in Shiga Prefecture
Railway stations in Japan opened in 1889
Tōkaidō Main Line
Stations of Japan Freight Railway Company
Maibara, Shiga